Wnt7b is a signaling protein that plays a crucial role for many developmental processes including placental, lung, eye, dendrite, and bone formation along with kidney development. The primary role of Wnt7b is to establish the cortico-medullary axis of epithelial organization.

Protein Wnt-7b is a protein that in humans is encoded by the WNT7B gene.

Function 
The WNT gene family consists of structurally related genes that encode secreted signaling proteins. These proteins have been implicated in oncogenesis and in several developmental processes, including regulation of cell fate and patterning during embryogenesis. This gene is a member of the WNT gene family. It encodes a protein showing 99% and 91% amino acid identity to the mouse and Xenopus Wnt7A proteins, respectively. Among members of the human WNT family, this protein is most similar to WNT7A protein (77.1% total amino acid identity). This gene may play important roles in the development and progression of gastric cancer, esophageal cancer, and pancreatic cancer.

Role in kidney 
Wnt7b is a key paracrine signaling factor secreted by the ureteric epithelium that establishes the cortico-medullary axis of the mammalian kidney. Wnt7b is a signaling protein that plays a crucial role for many developmental processes including placental, lung, eye, dendrite, and bone formation along with kidney development. The primary role of Wnt7b is to establish the cortico-medullary axis of epithelial organization. The establishment of the cortico-medullary axis plays an essential role for the development of the medullary component of the kidney. Wnt7b regulates orientation of cell divisions in renal medullary collecting duct epithelium, in which is the major structure driving renal medulla formation. There are two interstitial regulators that are explicitly linked to medullary development; Pod1 which encodes a transcription factor expressed in the renal interstitium while p57Kip2 encodes a cyclin-dependent kinase inhibitor which is linked to Beckwith-Wiedemann syndrome. Pod1, p57Kip2 and integrin α3 (ITGA3) are three factors that are involved in renal medullary morphogenesis. The knockout of Pod1 results in no renal medullary formation while p57Kip2 and Itga3 knockouts resulted in a reduced renal medulla. Removal of Wnt7b activity leads to a failure of medullary development while other aspects of kidney development including ureteric branching, development of the renal cortex, and nephrogenesis are unaffected. The absence of renal medulla also affects the plane of epithelial cell division along with little proliferative growth of the loop of Henle. Wnt7b null allele will result in fatality due to the diminution of placental function leading to the failure to initiate organogenesis.

References

Further reading